Sar Taq (also Romanized as Sar Ţāq; also known as Sar Tagh) is a village in Hamzehlu Rural District, in the Central District of Khomeyn County, Markazi Province, Iran. At the 2006 census, its population was 192, in 50 families.

References 

Populated places in Khomeyn County